The Krebs's fat mouse (Steatomys krebsii) is a species of rodent in the family Nesomyidae.
It is found in Angola, Botswana, Lesotho, Namibia, South Africa, and Zambia.
Its natural habitats are Mediterranean-type shrubby vegetation and subtropical or tropical high-altitude grassland. Its name honours Georg Ludwig Engelhard Krebs (1792–1844), a German natural history collector in South Africa.

References
 Monadjem, A. & Schlitter, D. 2004.  Steatomys krebsii.   2006 IUCN Red List of Threatened Species.   Downloaded on 20 July 2007.
Musser, G. G. and M. D. Carleton. 2005. Superfamily Muroidea. Pp. 894–1531 in Mammal Species of the World a Taxonomic and Geographic Reference. D. E. Wilson and D. M. Reeder eds. Johns Hopkins University Press, Baltimore.

Steatomys
Mammals described in 1852
Taxa named by Wilhelm Peters
Taxonomy articles created by Polbot